Rifle River State Recreation Area is a state park located on the upper reaches of the Rifle River within the Au Sable State Forest in Ogemaw County in the U.S. state of Michigan. Covering , the area provides a variety of recreational opportunities, including boating, canoeing, hiking, hunting, fishing, cross-country skiing, biking, and swimming.

This area was formerly a private hunting and fishing retreat owned by Harry Mulford Jewett, president of the Paige-Detroit Motor Car Company, for whom the Jewett automobile was named. In 1945 the tract, then called Grousehaven, was purchased by the Michigan Department of Conservation from Mrs. Jewett after her husband's death. The Department of Conservation renamed it the Rifle River Area and used it as a field laboratory for fish and game research. In 1963, the Parks Division acquired the area and it is now known as the Rifle River State Recreation Area. The rifle river recreation area is a family friendly campground with more than 4,000 acres and ten scenic lakes. It is located in Ogemaw County northeast of West Branch in Lupton, Michigan.The park offers 150 campsites, along with many access points to the lake.  The campground includes a public beach, a playground for kids, and a boat launch. The land is partially wooded but also features many areas of sod like grass. It is highly maintained for public enjoyment..This is a great place to vacation in the summer because they have a lot to explore with outside activities such as swimming, fishing, biking, boating, etc… As well as that there are several different locations there where family and seniors get their pictures taken.The recreation area is not only good for the summer, it is also home to ice fishing because of its multiple lakes and streams. The 14 mile trails are great for hiking in the summer, but convenient for snowshoeing and cross country skiing in the winter. In the fall months some areas around the park are good for hunting such as the Huntmaster hunting blind. This also is a very well known area due to the environment, it incorporates activities for different interests and varying times of the year. The recreation park’s employees are very friendly, super helpful, and hands on when it comes to the park’s and visitor’s well being.

Hostmaster. “Rifle River Recreation Area.” Michigan, Michigan Economic Development Corporation, 15 Sept. 2020, https://www.michigan.org/property/rifle-river-recreation-area

Camping
Rifle River State Recreation Area offers 75 modern sites with electricity, modern shower houses, and  gnome shaped outhouses; and also three rustic campgrounds with a total of 99 rustic campsites with vault toilets as well as rustic cabins.

Fishery
All lakes and waterways encompassed within Rifle River State Recreation Area are closed to boats with motors. Devoe Lake, Grousehaven Lake, Grebe Lake, and Lodge Lake are open to fishing.  Jewett Lake is restricted to catch and release fishing with no live bait.  Fisheries research has been conducted on thirteen acre Jewett Lake starting in 1945 and has continued to present day.

Bluegills, bass, northern pike, yellow perch and trout can be found in Devoe, Grousehaven, Lodge, and Grebe Lakes. Brook, brown and rainbow trout are present throughout the many miles of streams in the recreation area.

References

External links
Rifle River Recreation Area, Michigan Department of Natural Resources
Rifle River Natural River Plan, May 1980, revised March 12, 2002, Michigan Department of Natural Resources, Fisheries Division
Rifle River Recreation Area Protected Planet (World Database on Protected Areas)

Protected areas of Ogemaw County, Michigan
State recreation areas of Michigan